Parliamentary elections were held in Slovakia on 30 September and 1 October 1994. The early elections were necessary after the Vladimír Mečiar 1992 government had been recalled in March 1994 by the National Council and a new temporary government under Jozef Moravčík had been created at the same time.

The governing Movement for a Democratic Slovakia (HZDS) lost seats, but remained the largest party in the National Council with over three times as many seats as the second-placed Common Choice, a left-wing alliance, which almost failed to enter the parliament despite its good performance in pre-election opinion polls. After the election, the HZDS formed a coalition with the Union of the Workers of Slovakia and the Slovak National Party.

Participating parties

Results

Notes

References

Parliamentary elections in Slovakia
Slovakia
1994 in Slovakia
September 1994 events in Europe
October 1994 events in Europe